Percy Elland (7 October 1908–3 March 1960) was an English newspaper editor.

Born in Doncaster, Elland attended Doncaster Grammar School before entering journalism.  In 1952, he became editor of the Evening Standard, serving until 1959, but making few changes to the title.  He then became a director and managing editor of the Standard, but died the following year.

References

1908 births
1960 deaths
English newspaper editors
English male journalists
People from Doncaster
London Evening Standard people